Cobel Darou headquartered in Tehran, Iran, is one of the biggest pharmaceutical companies in Iran. Cobel Darou engages in the research, registration, importing and marketing of pharmaceutical products for sale principally in the prescription market. Cobel Darou covers the most major therapeutic areas: cardiovascular, oncology, diabetes, central nervous system, internal medicine and vaccines.

History

Business

Regulatory

Sales & Marketing

Partners

References

Pharmaceutical companies of Iran
Pharmaceutical companies established in 2001